Galleh Dar District is a district (bakhsh) in Mohr County, Fars Province, Iran. At the 2006 census, its population was 16,194, in 3,181 families.  The District has one city: Galleh Dar. The District has two rural districts (dehestan): Fal Rural District and Galleh Dar Rural District.

References 

Mohr County
Districts of Fars Province